is the fifth single by the Japanese J-pop group Every Little Thing, released on August 6, 1997.

Track listing
 Deatta Koro no Yō ni (Words & music - Mitsuru Igarashi) 
 Deatta Koro no Yō ni (Summer Night mix)
 Deatta Koro no Yō ni (instrumental)

Chart positions

External links
 Deatta Koro no Yō ni information at Avex Network.
 Deatta Koro no Yō ni information at Oricon.

1997 singles
Every Little Thing (band) songs
Songs written by Mitsuru Igarashi
1997 songs